The list of ship launches in 1701 includes a chronological list of some ships launched in 1701.


References

1701
Ship launches